Vice Admiral Sir Alan Michael Massey, KCB, CBE (born 9 March 1953) is a former senior officer in the Royal Navy who served as the Second Sea Lord.

Early life and education
Massey was educated at the University of Liverpool and Britannia Royal Naval College.

Naval career
Massey trained as a seaman officer, specialising in above water warfare and as a fighter controller and navigator.

Staff tours included three appointments to the Ministry of Defence in London, serving in the NATO policy directorate, Defence Programmes and as assistant director of Navy Plans.  He also served twice in NATO staff appointments: as military assistant to the chairman of the NATO Military Committee in Brussels (1991–1992) and head of plans for the Supreme Allied Commander Atlantic in Norfolk, Virginia (1999–2001).  As a commodore, he led the Operations Division of the Permanent Joint Headquarters at Northwood and then went on to be Assistant Chief of the Naval Staff in July 2005. He assumed office as Second Sea Lord in a ceremony aboard HMS Victory in July 2008.

Later life
Having left the Navy, Massey was appointed chief executive of the Maritime and Coastguard Agency on 20 July 2010. During his time at the MCA, Massey was responsible for leading the MCA through a period of change, which included a reorganisation of HM Coastguard and the UK's search and rescue helicopter capability. Massey's other responsibilities at the MCA included leading the UK's efforts to improve safety at sea. Massey stepped down as chief executive on 31 October 2018.

Massey was appointed a non-executive director at Shoreham Port in January 2019.

Honours
On 31 October 2003, Massey was appointed Commander of the Order of the British Empire (CBE) "in recognition of gallant and distinguished services whilst on operations in Iraq during the period 19th March to 19th April 2003". He was appointed Knight Commander of the Order of the Bath (KCB) in the 2009 Queen's Birthday Honours.

References

|-

1953 births
Living people
Alumni of the University of Liverpool
Commanders of the Order of the British Empire
Graduates of Britannia Royal Naval College
Her Majesty’s Coastguard personnel (United Kingdom)
Knights Commander of the Order of the Bath
Lords of the Admiralty
Royal Navy vice admirals
Royal Navy personnel of the Iraq War
Royal Navy personnel of the War in Afghanistan (2001–2021)
People educated at Northgate Grammar School, Ipswich